Alan Raph (born July 3, 1933, in New York City  ) is a bass trombonist, composer, arranger, and conductor who founded  and conducts the Danbury Brass Band. He has recorded with many popular musicians and for television, movies, and ballet. He was for many years on first call with most New York City recording studios.

Life 
Raph was born in New York City to  Marion McGuire and Ted Raph. His father was a jazz trombonist in the 1920s and 1930s. Raph married Theresa Capp on October 5, 1957. They had two children. In 1978 he married musician Mary Ann O'Connor, with whom he had a son.

Education  

Raph graduated from New York University with a Bachelor of Science degree in Music Education. He then studied at Teachers College Columbia University where he received a Masters of Arts degree. He has studied privately with Nadia Boulanger, John Mehegan, Simon Karasick, and Gabriel Masson.

Professional career 

He was a charter member of  the American Symphony Orchestra for which he played the bass trombone. He was for many years the bass trombone player on first call with most  New York City recording studios.

He has performed under the direction of Leopold Stokowski, with the Gerry Mulligan Concert Jazz Band and the Chamber Brass Players. As a freelance trombonist, he has recorded albums with artists including Quincy Jones, Don Sebesky, Philip Glass, the NBC Opera Company, Eugene Ormandy, Paul Whiteman and his Palais Royale Orchestra, the Ballet Bolshoi Theatre, Diana Ross, Lena Horne and Mel Torme. He has also recorded music for many movies and television shows including Sesame Street, The Cosby Show, Name That Tune, The Godfather, The Producers, Midnight Cowboy, Hamburger Hill, Bananas, Kundun, Fog of War, Secret Window, and Taking Lives.

He was a professor at the Teachers College of Columbia University in New York City, as well as instructor and associate professor at Queens College of the City University of New York. He is the founder, music director, and conductor of the Danbury Brass Band, for which he has composed and arranged many pieces. The ensemble is composed of trumpets, cornets, French horns, trombones, euphoniums, and tubas. The band has performed abroad in Australia, Bermuda, Ireland, Australia and New Zealand.

He has composed for the Joffrey Ballet Company. He also arranged several songs for the Broadway musical Rockabye Hamlet (1976). Raph is a member of ASCAP.

Raph is known for his low range playing. He was awarded the Most Valuable Player award by the National Academy of Recording Arts and Sciences.

Compositions

Works for wind band 
 Variations on a Theme by Handel, for trombone and band
 Fantasy on a Theme by Purcell, for flute and band

Ballets 
 Trinity, premiered in 1970 by the Joffrey Ballet Company
 Sacred Grove on Mt. Tamalpais, premiered in 1971 by the Joffrey Ballet Company

Chamber music 
 Burlesque, for trombone ensemble (ca. 1956, per the composer)

Pedagogical works 
 Bel Canto Vocalises for Bass Trombone
 Beyond Boundaries
 Diversified Trombone Etudes
 Arban Trombone
 Melodious Etudes
 Recital Pieces for Unaccompanied Trombone
 The Double Valve Bass Trombone
 Trombonisms

Media 
 Alan Raph: trombone tips - warmups
 Alan Raph: trombone tips - high notes
 Alan Raph: trombone tips - Bumble Bee
 Alan Raph: trombone tips - very low notes
 Alan Raph: trombone tips - The Bartok glissando
 Alan Raph: trombone tips - staccato & legato
 Alan Raph: trombone tips - double (& triple) tonguing
 Alan Raph: trombone tips - Reading jazz notation

Publications 
 Dance Band Reading and Interpretation, Alfred Music Publishers, 2002. 44 p., 
 "Le" Trombone, AR Publishing Co., 1983. 
 Trombonisms, Carl Fischer, Inc., 1983. 
 "Les" Brass, AR Publishing Co., 1984. 
 "L" Orchestra, AR Publishing Co., 1986.

Discography 

With J. J. Johnson
Goodies (RCA Victor, 1965)
With Lee Konitz
Chicago 'n All That Jazz (Groove Merchant, 1975)
With Gerry Mulligan
Walk on the Water (DRG, 1980)
The Concert Jazz Band
With Jerome Richardson
Groove Merchant (Verve, 1968)

Bibliography 
 Michael Cuscuna, Michel Ruppli: The Blue Note label : a discography, Revised and expanded edition, Westport, Connecticut: Greenwood Press, 2001, 913 p.
 :de:Wolfgang Suppan, :de:Armin Suppan: Das Neue Lexikon des Blasmusikwesens, 4. Auflage, Freiburg-Tiengen, Blasmusikverlag Schulz GmbH, 1994, 
 Michel Ruppli, Ed Novitsky: The Mercury labels : a discography, Vol. V: record and artist indexes, Westport, Connecticut: Greenwood Press, 1993, 882 p.
 E. Ruth Anderson: Contemporary American composers - A biographical dictionary, Second edition, Boston: G. K. Hall, 1982, 578 p., 
 Jaques Cattell Press: ASCAP biographical dictionary of composers, authors and publishers, Fourth edition, New York: R. R. Bowker, 1980, 589 p.,

References

External links 
 Official homepage 
 Biography from Trombone Page of the World
 Conn-Selmer Artist's Page

1933 births
American jazz trombonists
Male trombonists
American jazz composers
Living people
Musicians from New York City
New York University alumni
Teachers College, Columbia University alumni
Teachers College, Columbia University faculty
Jazz musicians from New York (state)
21st-century trombonists
American male jazz composers
21st-century American male musicians